The MÁV Class 411 was a class of steam locomotives used by Hungarian railways.

History
After World War II, Hungary, like many of the war-torn European countries, suffered a severe shortage of motive power, with much of the MÁV stock either damaged, destroyed, or confiscated by German forces to replace their damaged equipment. The US Government offered Hungary a $150 million commodity loan and a part of this was used to purchase 510 pieces of the USATC S160 Class steam locomotives, for $10,000 each. The negotiations started in 1946, with the first engines arriving in May 1947. The origins of the Hungarian S160s were as follows:

ALCO - 159 pc.
Baldwin  - 148 pc.
Lima - 203 pc.

In their delivery state 425 locomotives were set up as coal burners while 85 engines were oil burners, the engines could easily be converted from one fuel to the other as needed.

The locomotives were classified due to their four driven axles and an axle load higher than 14.3 metric tons as MÁV Class 411. The Hungarian series numbering followed neither the manufacturer's name or number, nor the production date, but the arrival date in Hungary. The poorest quality 28 engines got no MÁV numbers, these were preserved as component sources for later repairs. MÁV immediately performed tests to find out load characteristics, loading and braking tables were created. By January 1948, 405 locomotives were already prepared for service.

Modifications
Unlike many other European users of the S160 locomotives MÁV considered these engines as a medium-term solution and decided to change many details  on them. These changes were performed during a longer period, up to the 1960s. The most important and well visible changes were the following ones:

Lifting the cab roof height by 30 cm by welding a horizontal steel strip into cab side and front. This was necessary as the Class S160 engines were designed to negotiate the low British clearances and were very low-pitched for usual personnel.
Replacing the square front windows and the left side front door by standard oval windows.
Adding a protection cover for the turret on the longboiler top in front of the cab.
Moving the air pump from the smokebox front to the smokebox left side.
Increasing the stack height
Replacing the steam engine brake with an air brake 
Adding train heating hose and coupling
Lifting the tender coal bunker bottom height
Replacing the American whistle with a MÁV standard one

Class 411 locomotives hauled mainly medium size freight trains, as well as occasional passenger trains. They were considered as reliable and handsome engines with considerable reserves.

Withdrawal

Their withdrawal started in 1965 and continued by scrapping 15-30 locomotives every year. In 1980 only 6 pieces remained; they were withdrawn in the following three years. According to preservation lists, three Class 411 machines are preserved in Hungary:

411,118 - Hungarian Railway Museum, Budapest, operational
411,264 - Hatvan RR. station, plinthed
411,358 - Hegyeshalom station, plinthed

The 411,144 was originally intended to be preserved with the Hungarian National Collection, but was mistakenly sent to be scrapped.  Fortunately, the 411,144 was purchased in 1992 by Martin Haines for the Milton-Keynes Locomotion & Navigation (GB), and is now preserved at the Churnet Valley Railway, along with another S160 from China. 411,388 was sold to the East Lancashire Railway in the same year, and is currently undergoing an overhaul at the Nottingham Transport Heritage Centre.  The center also has received the remains of 411,380 and 411,337, which will be used as parts sources for 411,388. The boiler of 411.005 remains in Hungary.

References

External links

 Hungarian Railway Museum

Steam locomotives of Hungary
2-8-0 locomotives
ALCO locomotives
Baldwin locomotives
Lima locomotives
Railway locomotives introduced in 1947
Standard gauge locomotives of Hungary
1′D h2 locomotives

hu:USATC S160
USATC S160 Class